Elhadj Abdoulaye Tanor Ngom (born 19 January 1998) is a Senegalese college basketball player for the Florida State Seminoles of the Atlantic Coast Conference (ACC). He previously played for the Ryerson Rams.

Early life and youth career
A native of Dakar, Senegal, Ngom stood about  when he was 12 years old. He began taking interest in basketball at age 14, even though his father initially wanted him to focus on his education instead. Due to the lack of facilities, he ran on the beach and did push-ups to train, impressing his father. At age 15, Ngom moved away from his family for three years to play for the youth programs of Unicaja Málaga in Spain and Nürnberg Falcons in Germany. In 2017, he was discovered by Ryerson head coach Roy Rana at the SEED Project's Hoop Forum in Dakar, an event featuring top high school players in Senegal. Ngom obtained a visa to attend school in Canada and chose to play basketball under Rana at U Sports program Ryerson, despite also drawing interest from National Collegiate Athletic Association programs.

College career

Ryerson
Ngom played three years of basketball for U Sports program Ryerson, leading the Rams to a 55–15 record. As a freshman, Ngom averaged 5.8 points, 4.2 rebounds and 1.3 blocks per game and was named to the Ontario University Athletics (OUA) All-Rookie Team. In the offseason, he gained almost , which helped him improve as a sophomore. In August 2018, Ngom became the first player from a Canadian university to participate in the Nike Skills Challenge. In his sophomore season, he averaged 11.3 points, 5.6 rebounds and 2.3 blocks per game. He set Ryerson's single-season blocks record and tied a program record with a field goal percentage of 63.8 percent in the regular season. After the season, Ngom declared for the 2019 NBA draft, before returning to school. He missed the first six games of his junior season with an injury. On 11 January 2020, Ngom grabbed a program-record 23 rebounds to go with 23 points in an 87–82 win over Western. He finished the season averaging 16.7 points, 11.5 rebounds and 1.9 blocks per game and was named a Second Team OUA All-Star. In 60 career games at Ryerson, Ngom averaged  10.6 points, 6.6 rebounds and 1.8 blocks per game, shooting 61 percent from the field and led the team to a 55-15 record.

Florida State
On 10 July 2020, Ngom signed a grant-in-aid agreement to play basketball for Florida State. He averaged 2.4 points and 1.7 rebounds per game as a senior. Ngom opted to return to Florida State for his fifth season of eligibility, granted due to the COVID-19 pandemic. On 27 November 2021, he strained his knee in practice, forcing him to miss several games.

References

External links
Florida State Seminoles bio
Ryerson Rams bio

1998 births
Living people
Senegalese men's basketball players
Senegalese expatriate basketball people in Canada
Senegalese expatriate basketball people in Spain
Senegalese expatriate basketball people in Germany
Toronto Metropolitan University alumni
Centers (basketball)
Basketball players from Dakar